Laitsna-Hurda is a village in Rõuge Parish, Võru County in Estonia.

References

 "Hurda"

Villages in Võru County